Atman is a 1997 documentary film by Finnish director Pirjo Honkasalo about two Indian brothers on a pilgrimage. It is the final installment of Honkasalo's "Trilogy of the Sacred and the Satanic", preceded by Mysterion (1991) and Tanjuska and the 7 Devils (1993). Atman received the Joris Ivens Award at the International Documentary Film Festival Amsterdam.

References

1997 films
1997 documentary films
Finnish documentary films
Films directed by Pirjo Honkasalo
Documentary films about Hinduism